Britain is an unincorporated community village in Loudoun County, Virginia lying along Milltown Creek. It is located on the eastern flanks of Short Hill Mountain along  Mountain Road (VA Route 690) at its junction with Britain Road.

History
Originally known as Guinea, the village of Britain—named after Michigan senator Calvin Britain—became the place of settlement for a free African American community in the mid 19th century. Mount Sinai Free Baptist Church was built here in 1880 and served as a school for the community until 1915. Unlike most of the black settlements in Loudoun County, Britain had a post office in operation. Its African American residents began to move elsewhere in the early 19th century with the last black families leaving Britain in the 1920s.

African-American history of Virginia
Unincorporated communities in Loudoun County, Virginia
Washington metropolitan area
Unincorporated communities in Virginia